Zabrus foveolatus is a species of ground beetle in the Pterostichinae subfamily. It was described by Schaum in 1864 and is found in such Asian countries as Armenia and Turkey.

References

Beetles described in 1864
Beetles of Asia
Zabrus
Taxa named by Hermann Rudolph Schaum